Cynanchum socotranum, synonym Sarcostemma socotranum, is a species of plant in the family Apocynaceae. It is endemic to Socotra Island, south of Yemen.  Its natural habitat is subtropical or tropical dry shrubland.

References

Endemic flora of Socotra
socotranum
Data deficient plants
Taxonomy articles created by Polbot